Point Wild is a point  west of Cape Valentine,  east of Saddleback Point, and directly adjacent to the Furness Glacier on the north coast of Elephant Island. It was named Cape Wild by the Shackleton Endurance expedition 1914–16, but Point Wild is recommended for this feature because of its small size and to avoid confusion with Cape Wild on George V Coast.

It was named for Frank Wild, leader of the party from Shackleton's shipwrecked expedition which camped and managed to survive on the point for four and a half months until they were rescued on 30 August 1916.

Historic site
A bust of Captain Luis Alberto Pardo, with a monolith and plaques, have been placed at the point to celebrate the rescue of the survivors of the Endurance by the Yelcho. The inscription reads:
"Here on August 30th, 1916, the Chilean Navy cutter Yelcho commanded by Pilot Luis Pardo Villalón rescued the 22 men from the Shackleton Expedition who survived the wreck of the Endurance living for four and one half months in this Island".

The monolith and plaques, along with replicas at the Chilean Antarctic research stations of Capitan Arturo Prat and President Eduardo Frei, were surmounted with the bronze busts of Pardo during the XXIVth Chilean Antarctic Scientific Expedition in 1987–88. The installation at the point has been designated a Historic Site or Monument (HSM 53), following a proposal by Chile to the Antarctic Treaty Consultative Meeting.

See also
Houlder Bluff, a bluff overlooking Point Wild

References

Wild
Elephant Island
Historic Sites and Monuments of Antarctica